Belcher may refer to:

People 
Last name
 Belcher (surname)
Middle name
Listed alphabetically by last name
 Timothy Belcher Dyk (born 1937), American federal judge
 Andrew Belcher Gray (1820–1862), American surveyor
 John Hill Belcher Mason (1858–1919), American stage actor
 George Belcher Murray (1895–1941), Canadian political figure in Nova Scotia

Places

Canada 
 Belcher, Manitoba, an unincorporated area in northern Manitoba
 Belcher station, a railway station located here
 Belcher Channel, a waterway in Nunavut
 Belcher Channel Formation, a geologic formation
 Belcher Islands, an archipelago in Hudson Bay
 Belcher Mountains, a late Precambrian range in the Hudson Bay region

Hong Kong 
 Belcher (constituency), a constituency in the Central and Western District
 Belcher Bay, on the northwest shore of Hong Kong Island
 The Belcher's, a residential building near Belcher Bay
 Belcher Station, a former name of HKU station, an MTR station
 Belcher's Street, located in Kennedy Town

United States 
Populated places
 Belcher, Kentucky, an unincorporated community in Pike County
 Belcher, Louisiana, a village in Caddo Parish
 Belcher's Town, Massachusetts, a former name of Belchertown, Massachusetts
Houses
 Belcher Family Homestead and Farm, a historic home and farm complex in Tioga County, New York
 Belcher-Holden Farm, a historic home and farm complex in Tioga County, New York
 Belcher-Rowe House, a historic home in Milton, Massachusetts
 Jonathan Belcher House, a historic house in Randolph, Massachusetts
Other
 Belcher Branch, a stream in West Virginia
 Belcher Camp, a ghost town located in Ferry County, Washington
 Belcher Mound Site, an archaeological site in Caddo Parish, Louisiana

Elsewhere 
 Belcher, Kazakhstan, a village in Yrgyz District, Aktobe Region, also known as Belsher
 Belcher's Bar, a hamlet in Leicestershire, England

Wildlife
 Belcher's sea snake, an extremely venomous species (Hydrophis belcheri)
 Belcher's gull, a bird found along the Pacific coast of South America (Larus belcheri)

Other
 Autoclenz Ltd v Belcher, a landmark court case about labour law in the United Kingdom

See also 
 
 
 Bechler, a German surname
 Belching